Isshu may refer to:

Poetry 
Hyakunin Isshu, a traditional anthology style of compiling Japanese waka poetry

People 
Isshū Nagata (1903–1988), Japanese photographer
Isshu Sugawara (born 1962), Japanese politician

Video games 
The Unova region, a region in the fictional Pokémon franchise known as the Isshu region in Japanese